Craig Nicholas Winrow (born 22 December 1971 in Ormskirk) is a male retired English middle-distance runner competing primarily in the 800 metres.

Early life
Winrow was educated at Burscough Priory High School in Burscough, Lancashire. As a 14 year old student in 1986, he "shattered" the Lancashire Schools' County Athletics Championships in the  event, finishing with a time of 2 minutes and 1.3 seconds, beating the previous best by 3 seconds. By the age of 16, he was being sponsored by local computer firm Southport Hi-Tech, where he planned to join on a youth training scheme after leaving school. As a young athlete, he looked up to Steve Ovett and was aiming to compete in the 1992 Summer Olympics. In 1987, he was described by The Guardian as being "the most exciting 800-metre prospect in Britain since the schooldays of Cram and Coe." Success in athletics came relatively early during his school days, having originally been a sprinter and was described as having "the heritage of a sprint finish that has subsequently devastated his peers".

Athletics career
In the summer of 1989, he was the winner of the 1989 European Athletics Junior Championships 800-metre event in Varaždin, Yugoslavia, having initially trailed but overtook everyone on the final lap to victory. He loved running and was known to tell others what they were missing, suggesting that if he wasn't running then he may be "working in a packing factory or something."

He represented England in the 800 metres event at the 1994 Commonwealth Games in Victoria, British Columbia, Canada. He represented Great Britain at the 1996 Summer Olympics reaching the semifinals.

His personal bests in the event are 1:45.23 outdoors (Rome 1996) and 1:47.78 indoors (Glasgow 1994).

Coaching
Nowadays he works as a coach. He has trained, among others, Andrew Osagie and Adelle Tracey.

Competition record

References

1971 births
Living people
People from Ormskirk
English male middle-distance runners
Athletes (track and field) at the 1994 Commonwealth Games
Athletes (track and field) at the 1996 Summer Olympics
Commonwealth Games competitors for England
Olympic athletes of Great Britain